Mikhmoret Light, or Mevo'ot Yam Light, is a lighthouse in Mikhmoret, Israel. It is located in the Mevo'ot Yam nautical school, on the north side of the harbor of Mikhmoret.

See also
 List of lighthouses in Israel

References

 Listed as "Mikhmoret, at Nautical School".

Lighthouses in Israel
Buildings and structures in Central District (Israel)